The Maysville and Lexington Railroad, North Division, was a 19th- and early 20th-century railway company in north-central Kentucky in the United States. It operated from 1876, when it reëstablished service on the routes of its failed predecessor, the Northern Division, until 1921, when it was purchased along with the Southern Division by the L&N. 

Its routes and rights-of-way are today owned by CSX Transportation.

See also
 Maysville and Lexington Railroad
 List of Kentucky railroads

Defunct Kentucky railroads
Defunct companies based in Kentucky
Railway companies established in 1876
Railway companies disestablished in 1921
1876 establishments in Kentucky
1921 disestablishments in Kentucky
American companies disestablished in 1921